Events from the year 1958 in Iran.

Incumbents
 Shah: Mohammad Reza Pahlavi 
 Prime Minister: Manouchehr Eghbal

Events
 April 6 – Soraya Esfandiary-Bakhtiari is divorced by the Shah of Iran, Mohammad Reza Pahlavi, after she is unable to produce any children.

Births
January 6 – Mohsen Rastani, photographer and journalist

Deaths
 Death of Ali Soheili.

References

 
Iran
Years of the 20th century in Iran
1950s in Iran
Iran